Ecology is the scientific study of the distribution and abundance of organisms and their interactions with their environment.

Ecology or Ecologist may also refer to:

Publications
Ecology (journal)
Journal of Ecology
The Ecologist, a British environmental magazine
Ecology: Can We Survive Under Capitalism?
Ecology: From Individuals to Ecosystems, a textbook

Organisations
Ecology Party, an early name for the Green Party in the UK
Ecology Building Society
Ecology movement, aimed at protecting the environment (similar to the environmental movement)

Music
Ecology (album), an album by Rare Earth
The Ecology, album by Fashawn 2014
"The Ecology", song by Fashawn from Boy Meets World 2009
"Mercy Mercy Me (The Ecology)", from Marvin Gaye's 1971 album What's Going On

See also
Environmentalism, a social and political movement often associated with ecology
Eco (disambiguation)

Science disambiguation pages